Jailton Jesus Almeida Junior (born June 28, 1991) is a Brazilian mixed martial artist who competes in the Light Heavyweight and Heavyweight divisions in the Ultimate Fighting Championship. As of March 7, 2023, he is #13 in the UFC heavyweight rankings.

Background
Born in the Brotas neighborhood of Salvador, where he lives to this day, he first became interested in football, while accompanying his father through the rings. While Jailton's first dream was to be a soccer player, the reality was hard on him and his financial condition became an obstacle after he was required to acquire R$10,000 to join a soccer club. He ended up going into the world of fights following his father's footsteps, with Almeida beginning training boxing at the age of six, picking up Brazilian jiu-jitsu at 11. He eventually started training mixed martial arts as his jiu-jitsu training partners were training it. There, financial difficulties also imposed themselves, with Jailton coming to work as a doorman and guard, while his dream of being a fighter did not come true.

The son of divorced parents and with 11 siblings, his older brother Alexandre disappeared one day after being involved with a criminal syndicate and was never seen again.

Mixed martial arts career

Early career
To start his professional mixed martial arts career, Almeida racked a 13–2 record in Brazilian regional circuit.

Dana White's Contender Series
After claiming the Thunder Fight title, Almeida was invited to face Nasrudin Nasrudinov at Dana White's Contender Series 39 on September 14, 2021. He won the bout via second-round submission and was awarded a UFC contract.

Ultimate Fighting Championship
Almeida was scheduled to make his promotional debut against Danilo Marques on November 13, 2021 at UFC Fight Night 197. However Marques required surgery so the bout was rescheduled for February 5, 2022 at UFC Fight Night 200. Almeida won the fight via technical knockout in round one.

Move up to heavyweight
As his sophomore appearance in the organization, Almeida was scheduled to face Maxim Grishin on May 21, 2022, at UFC Fight Night 206. However, Grishin pulled out due to undisclosed reasons in late April. Almeida decided to move up to heavyweight to face Parker Porter. He won the fight via rear-naked choke in round one.

As the first bout of his new contract, Almeida was scheduled to face Shamil Abdurakhimov at UFC 279 on September 10, 2022. However, Abdurakhimov was forced to withdraw due to visa issues and was replaced by Anton Turkalj at a catchweight of 220 pounds. He dominated the bout, taking down Turkalj and submitting him at the end of the first round via rear-naked choke. He received his first Performance of the Night bonus award.

The bout against Shamil Abdurakhimov was rebooked for UFC 280 on October 22, 2022. With that date also falling through, the pair was re-booked for a third time at UFC 283. Almeida won the fight via technical knockout in the second round. With this win, he received the Performance of the Night award.

Almeida is scheduled to faced  Jairzinho Rozenstruik on May 13, 2023 at UFC Fight Night 224.

Championships and accomplishments 
Ultimate Fighting Championship
Performance of the Night (Two times) 
Fight On MMA
FON Light Heavyweight Championship (one time)
Thunder Fight
Thunder Fight Light Heavyweight Championship (one time; former)

Mixed martial arts record

|-
|Win
|align=center|18–2
|Shamil Abdurakhimov
|TKO (punches)
|UFC 283
|
|align=center|2
|align=center|2:56
|Rio de Janeiro, Brazil
|
|-
|Win
|align=center|17–2
|Anton Turkalj
|Submission (rear-naked choke)
|UFC 279
|
|align=center|1
|align=center|4:27
|Las Vegas, Nevada, United States
|
|-
|Win
|align=center|16–2
|Parker Porter
|Submission (rear-naked choke)
|UFC Fight Night: Holm vs. Vieira
|
|align=center|1
|align=center|4:35
|Las Vegas, Nevada, United States
|
|-
|Win
|align=center|15–2
|Danilo Marques
|TKO (punches)
|UFC Fight Night: Hermansson vs. Strickland
| 
|align=center|1
|align=center|2:57
|Las Vegas, Nevada, United States
|
|-
|Win
|align=center|14–2
|Nasrudin Nasrudinov
|Submission (rear-naked choke)
|Dana White's Contender Series 39
| 
|align=center|2
|align=center|1:49
|Las Vegas, Nevada, United States
|
|-
|Win
|align=center|13–2
|Edvaldo de Oliveira
|Submission (rear-naked choke)
|Thunder Fight 24
| 
|align=center|1
|align=center|3:40
|São Paulo, Brazil
|
|-
|Win
|align=center|12–2
|Ildemar Alcântara
|Submission (arm-triangle choke)
|Thunder Fight 23
| 
|align=center|1
|align=center|4:49
|São Bernardo do Campo, Brazil
|
|-
|Win
|align=center|11–2
|Leonardo Argemiro Vasconcelos Correa
|TKO (punches)
|Future FC 11
| 
|align=center|1
|align=center|1:58
|São Paulo, Brazil
|
|-
|Win
|align=center|10–2
|Ednaldo Oliveira
|Submission (arm-triangle choke)
|Fight On MMA 6
| 
|align=center|2
|align=center|1:51
|Salvador, Brazil
|
|-
|Win
|align=center|9–2
|Rian Tavares
|TKO (punches)
|Imperium MMA Pro 14
| 
|align=center|1
|align=center|2:34
|Feira de Santana, Brazil
|
|-
|Win
|align=center|8–2
|Italo Nascimento
|KO (punches)
|Premier Fight League 20
| 
|align=center|1
|align=center|2:05
|Lauro de Freitas, Brazil
|
|-
|Win
|align=center|7–2
|Douglas Garcia
|Submission (rear-naked choke)
|JF Fight Evolution 19
| 
|align=center|1
|align=center|2:30
|Juiz de Fora, Brazil
|
|-
|Win
|align=center|6–2
|David Allan
|TKO (punches)
|Fight On: Solidário
| 
|align=center|1
|align=center|1:26
|Salvador, Brazil
|
|-
|Loss
|align=center|5–2
|Bruno Assis
|Decision (unanimous)
|Shooto Brazil 80
| 
|align=center|3
|align=center|5:00
|Rio de Janeiro, Brazil
|
|-
|Win
|align=center|5–1
|Anderson Oliveira do Nascimento
|Submission (rear-naked choke)
|Fight On MMA 5
| 
|align=center|1
|align=center|4:16
|Salvador, Brazil
|
|-
|Loss
|align=center|4–1
|Tyago Moreira
|KO (punch)
|Katana Fight 3
| 
|align=center|1
|align=center|0:16
|Colombo, Brazil
|
|-
|Win
|align=center|4–0
|Fagner Rakchal
|TKO (punches)
|Fight On MMA 4
| 
|align=center|2
|align=center|1:15
|Salvador, Brazil
|
|-
|Win
|align=center|3–0
|Roberto Bispo Silva
|Submission (rear-naked choke)
|Cross Fighting Championship 2
| 
|align=center|2
|align=center|1:30
|Itabuna, Brazil
|
|-
|Win
|align=center|2–0
|Leonardo Alves
|Submission (rear-naked choke)
|Conquista Kombat Championship
| 
|align=center|1
|align=center|0:49
|Vitória da Conquista, Brazil
|
|-
|Win
|align=center|1–0
|Diego Reis
|Submission (rear-naked choke)
|Nocaute MMA Fight 2
| 
|align=center|1
|align=center|N/A
|Eunápolis, Brazil
|

See also 
 List of current UFC fighters
 List of male mixed martial artists

References

External links 
  
 

1991 births
Living people
Brazilian male mixed martial artists
Light heavyweight mixed martial artists
Mixed martial artists utilizing Brazilian jiu-jitsu
Ultimate Fighting Championship male fighters
Brazilian practitioners of Brazilian jiu-jitsu
People awarded a black belt in Brazilian jiu-jitsu